Many-sorted logic can reflect formally our intention not to handle the universe as a homogeneous collection of objects, but to partition it in a way that is similar to types in typeful programming. Both functional and assertive "parts of speech" in the language of the logic reflect this typeful partitioning of the universe, even on the syntax level: substitution and argument passing can be done only accordingly, respecting the "sorts".

There are various ways to formalize the intention mentioned above; a many-sorted logic is any package of information which fulfils it. In most cases, the following are given:
 a set of sorts, S
 an appropriate generalization of the notion of signature to be able to handle the additional information that comes with the sorts.
The domain of discourse of any structure of that signature is then fragmented into disjoint subsets, one for every sort.

Example
While a function  makes sense, a similar function  usually does not. Many-sorted logic allows one to have terms like , but to discard terms like  as syntactically ill-formed.

Algebraization 

The algebraization of many-sorted logic is explained in an article by Caleiro and Gonçalves, which generalizes abstract algebraic logic to the many-sorted case, but can also be used as introductory material.

Order-sorted logic

While many-sorted logic requires two distinct sorts to have disjoint universe sets, order-sorted logic allows one sort  to be declared a subsort of another sort , usually by writing  or similar syntax. In the above biology example, it is desirable to declare 
,
,
,
, 
, 
, 
and so on; cf. picture.

Wherever a term of some sort  is required, a term of any subsort of  may be supplied instead (Liskov substitution principle). For example, assuming a function declaration , and a constant declaration , the term   is perfectly valid and has the sort . In order to supply the information that the mother of a dog is a dog in turn, another declaration   may be issued; this is called function overloading, similar to overloading in programming languages.

Order-sorted logic can be translated into unsorted logic, using a unary predicate  for each sort , and an axiom  for each subsort declaration . The reverse approach was successful in automated theorem proving: in 1985, Christoph Walther could solve a then benchmark problem by translating it into order-sorted logic, thereby boiling it down an order of magnitude, as many unary predicates turned into sorts.

Smolka generalized order-sorted logic to allow for parametric polymorphism.
In his framework, subsort declarations are propagated to complex type expressions.
As a programming example, a parametric sort  may be declared (with  being a type parameter as in a C++ template), and from a subsort declaration  the relation  is automatically inferred, meaning that each list of integers is also a list of floats.

Schmidt-Schauß generalized order-sorted logic to allow for term declarations.

See also 

 Categorical logic
 Many-sorted first-order logic#Many-sorted logic

References 

Early papers on many-sorted logic include:
 , collected in the author's Computation, Logic, Philosophy. A Collection of Essays, Beijing: Science Press; Dordrecht: Kluwer Academic, 1990.

External links 
"Many-sorted Logic", the first chapter in Lecture Notes on Decision Procedures by Calogero G. Zarba

Systems of formal logic